Samuel Puni Kaleta, known as Sam Kaleta (born 9 March 1966 in Auckland) is a former New-Zealand born Samoan rugby union player who played also for Japan. He played as a flanker.

Career
Kaleta graduated from Lynfield College in Auckland. During his playing career, he played for the New Zealand clubs Kia Toa RFC and Ponsonby RFC, as well as for the Japanese clubs Ricoh Black Rams and Mitsubishi Sagamihara Dynaboars. In 1991 he played for the NZ Combined Services team of the New Zealand Defence Force and Police as lock. He finished his career in 2004 for Perthshire RFC.

His first cap for Japan was against Hong Kong, in Seoul, on 26 September 1992, playing four matches. In 1994, Kaleta decided to play for Samoa, his country of heritage; his first cap for the Manu Samoa was in the match against Wales, at Moamoa, on 4 June 1994. He also was part of the 1995 Rugby World Cup roster, although he did not play a match during the tournament. His last cap in his career was against Fiji, in Apia, on 5 July 1997.

In 2006, Kaleta joined the staff of Perthshire RFC and took responsibility for the club's academy. For some time he was the team's player-coach, even entering the field in 2008.

Notes

External links
 
 Sam P. Kaleta at New Zealand Rugby History

1966 births
Living people
Rugby union players from Auckland
Samoan rugby union players
Samoan expatriate sportspeople in Japan
Samoan expatriate sportspeople in Scotland
Samoan people of New Zealand descent
Rugby union flankers
Samoa international rugby union players
Japan international rugby union players
Ponsonby RFC players
Black Rams Tokyo players
Manawatu rugby union players
People educated at Lynfield College
New Zealand rugby union players
New Zealand expatriate rugby union players
New Zealand expatriate sportspeople in Japan
New Zealand expatriate sportspeople in Scotland
Expatriate rugby union players in Japan
Expatriate rugby union players in Scotland
Perthshire RFC players